Akef Mithqal Al-Fayez (Arabic: عاكف مثقال الفايز, Akif Al Fayiz; 15 September 1922 – 8 April 1998) was a Jordanian politician born in Amman, Jordan. He held several ministerial positions and became speaker of the Jordanian Parliament for several sessions and a member of the Jordanian Senate.

Family and early life 
Akef was born and raised in Jordan to one of the most prominent political families the Al-Fayez, to the tribal leader of the Bani Sakher Clan Mithqal Al-fayez. He was the eldest son from his wife Adul Khair, daughter of Amman's 5th mayor Saeed Khair. He had 6 full brothers who also held various political seats in Jordan, from oldest to youngest are Zaid, Tayil, Talal, Trad, Mohammad, and Mansour Al-Fayez. Akef's own son Faisal Al-Fayez would also have an important role in Jordanian and middle eastern politics.

Political career 
Akef enjoyed one of the most highly decorated political careers in Jordan, ranging from a variety of Ministerial offices and other high ranking politically influential offices. He held ministerial positions ten times and 2 Parliamentary positions, which are:

 In the government of Ibrahim Hashem , formed on April 24, 1957 as Minister of Agriculture and Minister of Defense in an amendment to the government on October 22, 1957,
 In the government of Samir Al-Rifai , formed on May 18, 1958, he held the position of Minister of Agriculture and Minister of Construction.
 in the government of Hazza al-Majali , formed on May 6, 1959, he held the position of Minister of Agriculture and Social Affairs
 in Bahjat Talhouni 's government, formed on August 29, 1960, he became Minister of Defense
 In the government of Samir al-Rifai, formed on March 27, 1963. he held the positions of Minister of Public Works and Minister of Transportation
 Then he held the same positions in the government of Sharif Hussein bin Nasser , formed on April 21, 1963.
 Akef holds his first position as speaker of the Jordanian Parliament from 1963 till 1966.
 In the government of Saad Jumah , formed on April 23, 1967, he held the positions of Minister of Transportation and Minister of Tourism and Antiquities.
 In the government of Bahjat Talhouni, formed on October 7, 1967, he held the position of Minister of Communications and Minister of State for Prime Minister Affairs.
 In the government of Abdelmunim Rifai , formed on March 24, 1969, he became Deputy Prime Minister and Minister of Interior
 He became Vice President and Minister for Prime Minister Affairs in an amendment made to the government on June 30, 1969,
 in Abdelmunim's government formed on June 27, 1970, he held the position of Minister of State for Prime Minister Affairs
 Akef later on served as speaker of the Jordanian Parliament for the second time in 1984

Al-Watan Political Party 
On July 14, 1993, the Al-Watan Political Party has been legalized in Jordan by King Hussein, and Akef Al-Fayez was its leader. The party's ideaology is Right of Center, Tribalist. The party was later combined with several other parties to form The National Constitutional Party.

See also 

 Fendi Al-Fayez
Sattam Al-Fayez
 Mithqal Al Fayez
 Faisal Al Fayez
 Al-Fayez

References 

State ministers of Jordan
Social affairs ministers of Jordan
Public works ministers of Jordan
Construction ministers of Jordan
Agriculture ministers of Jordan
Government ministers of Jordan
Deputy prime ministers of Jordan
Transport ministers of Jordan
Tourism ministers of Jordan
Interior ministers of Jordan
Prime ministry affairs ministers of Jordan
1922 births
1998 deaths
Akef